White Island may refer to:

Places

Oceania
Whakaari / White Island, volcanic island in the Bay of Plenty, New Zealand
2019 Whakaari / White Island eruption
White Island (Otago), Dunedin, New Zealand

North America
White Island, Paget, Bermuda
Qikiqtaaluk (Foxe Basin), formerly White Island, Nunavut, Canada
White Island (New York), or Mau Mau Island, U.S.
White and Seavey Islands, Isles of Shoals, New Hampshire, U.S.
White Island State Historic Site
White Island Pond, Massachusetts, U.S.
White Island Shores, Massachusetts, U.S.

Europe
White Island, Isles of Scilly, England
Eilean Bàn (White Island), Scotland
White Island, County Fermanagh, Northern Ireland
White Island, Ibiza
Beloostrov (White Island), St. Petersburg, Russia
Graciosa, or White Island, Azores
Kvitøya (White Island), Norway

Asia
White Island (Philippines)

Antarctica
White Island (Enderby Land)
White Island (Ross Archipelago)
White Islands, Sulzberger Bay

Other uses
White Island (film), 2016

See also

Isla Blanca (disambiguation)
Isle of Wight (disambiguation)
White's Island